Torchwood: Miracle Day is the fourth and final series of the British science fiction television programme Torchwood, a spin-off from the long-running show Doctor Who. In contrast to the first three series, which were produced by the BBC, the fourth series was a British–American co-production involving the BBC's drama production house BBC Cymru Wales for BBC Worldwide and the U.S. premium network Starz. It was broadcast in ten episodes beginning on 8 July 2011 (U.S.) and 14 July 2011 (UK).

The central plot of Miracle Day is that suddenly no one on Earth can die, which impels increasingly troublesome legislative changes around the world as the global population soars. In addition to a number of new American cast members and guest actors, showrunner Russell T Davies recruited several American television writers to write for Miracle Day, including Jane Espenson, John Shiban and Doris Egan. British writer John Fay also returned to write for the series, under Davies as head writer. Production was partially divided along trans-Atlantic lines, with Kelly Manners producing in the US, and Brian Minchin in the UK. The majority of the filming took place in Los Angeles, California, with two weeks of additional shooting in Wales.

Although the series premiered to a high Audience Appreciation Index rating (85, considered "excellent") and solid ratings in the UK, American critics were on the whole less favourable to the series opener. Reviews on both sides of the Atlantic became increasingly mixed as the series went on. Several commentators felt the series would have worked better as a five-episode series, highlighting concerns with inconsistent pacing, dangling plot threads, and a repetitive feel to mid-series episodes.

The series has a 10-episode companion web series Torchwood: Web of Lies, referenced on the Starz website (but not on the BBC One website) related to the series. It was available as an app from the iTunes Store, and the first episode can be obtained for free, and was available on Starz's YouTube channel. It is available in its entirety (without its interactive elements) in the series' DVD and Blu-ray releases. The series premiered on BBC America on 14 September 2013.

Synopsis

On the same day across the Earth, the concept of death is suddenly nullified when it is found that people who have suffered mortal wounds or fatal diseases are unable to die. This is initially seen as a religious miracle, but the absence of deaths begins to strain medical resources and spread diseases around the globe; the world's governments estimate that unless something is done, the world will be unable to sustain the population growth within four months.

Central Intelligence Agency agents Rex Matheson, who had suffered a fatal accident but remains alive, and Esther Drummond discover the name "Torchwood" tied with these events, and locate its remaining members, Jack Harkness and Gwen Cooper. In bringing them to the United States, they find themselves pursued by agents working for an entity called the Families. Jack discovers that his own immortality has disappeared, and believes this is connected to the events of the miracle. Jack brings Rex and Esther within Torchwood's folds.

The world governments institute a plan to bring those people that would normally have died from illnesses or injury into camps without exception. Torchwood infiltrates a camp and discovers the patients are actually incinerated in the camps. They reveal this to the world in the hope that the camps will shut down, but the world governments refuse, believing the camps to be a necessity, but the news puts the world into chaos. Meanwhile, Torchwood continues to track down the Families, discovering they have many agencies across the globe. Eventually Jack comes to realise that the Families represent the descendants of the patriarchs of three Catholic families that he had encountered in New York City in the 1920s. These men were, both, frightened by and covetous of his immortality and bought him, using scientific tests and bloodletting to try to understand his condition. The Families have grown incredibly powerful since then and have been able to take advantage of the miracle to their own financial and political ends.

Some months pass, and the world slides into a financial depression. Torchwood recognizes that the Families manipulated events just prior to the first day of the miracle in Shanghai and Buenos Aires, two points on opposite sides of the globe. With information from Oswald Danes, Jack realises the Families have found the Blessing, a literal blood line that runs between these points through the Earth, and that they had sent a quantity of Jack's blood from his previous bloodletting into the Blessing, which "rewrote" his immortality across the rest of humanity as a defensive mechanism. The team splits up between Jack and Gwen, and Rex and Esther, to investigate both points. Both teams find the Blessing in full control of the Families, and agents there note the only way to revert the miracle is to reintroduce Jack's now mortal blood into the Blessing from both ends. Rex reveals he had transfused himself with Jack's blood prior to their arrival. However, a member of the Families fatally shoots Esther, meaning she will die if the miracle is reversed. However, Gwen advises Rex not to stop, and simultaneously, Rex opens a wound and Gwen shoots Jack, and the blood enters the Blessing from both ends, ending the miracle. As the two facilities begin to collapse, Rex helps Esther to escape, but she dies in the aftermath, while Jack has regained his own immortality and escapes with Gwen. Later, as the world deals with the concept of death again, and Torchwood attends Esther's funeral, Rex is shot at by a Families mole in the CIA. However, he finds that he has become immortal like Jack.

Episodes

Production
Miracle Day was developed through a collaborative plotting, with individual episodes subsequently assigned to individual writers. Gardner and Davies spent four weeks alongside their writing staff working through the complete story. Writers subsequently elected to write those episodes which reflected their particular interests in certain themes or characters. The writing team chose to revise each episode before the first scene was shot; writer Jane Espenson felt this would give the series a much tighter feel and greater overall continuity. In writing Children of Earth and Miracle Day, Davies found his preference for the mini-series format and has stated Torchwood will not return to the "monster-of-the-week" stories typical of the show's first two series, finding the new format "more ambitious and intelligent".

Development
Early development rumours suggested that the fourth series would be a reboot of the show, and that it would air on Fox Network in the United States. However, the deal with Fox did not go through and a new co-production deal with Starz was officially announced. Torchwood creator and executive producer Russell T Davies clarified the focus of the series, stating "it's very much the next step. It's not a new version, it's not a reboot. We're simply moving countries." The series was first announced with the title Torchwood: The New World, though this was revised to Torchwood: Miracle Day later in development (The New World became the title of the first episode). The second executive producer, Julie Gardner, described the new series as being absolutely ready "to welcome in a new audience". Series writer Jane Espenson clarified further, describing the series as strictly "a continuation of the UK show".

Casting

The show's remaining three regulars returned to the series, with John Barrowman as Captain Jack Harkness, Eve Myles as Gwen Cooper and Kai Owen as Rhys Williams, Gwen's husband. Within the series, Captain Jack is an immortal ex-conman from the 51st century who first appeared in the 2005 Doctor Who episode "The Empty Child". In the first three series of Torchwood, Jack ran the Cardiff remnant of the Torchwood Institute, and was "the happiest he'd ever been". After the destruction of Torchwood and the deaths of his grandson, friends, and his lover Ianto Jones in the third series, the only thing that could bring Jack back to Earth is "his unstated love for Gwen Cooper and Torchwood". Gwen was previously seen heavily pregnant at the end of the third series by her husband Rhys. Since the fall of Torchwood, they have begun a quiet life living in seclusion with their baby, Anwen. Other returning characters included Gwen's former police partner PC Andy (Tom Price), now a sergeant, and her parents Geraint (William Thomas) and Mary Cooper (Sharon Morgan), who previously appeared in the 2008 Torchwood episode "Something Borrowed". All three featured in recurring roles.

Mekhi Phifer joined the show as Rex Matheson, the CIA's "golden boy" operative, fast-tracked for career stardom. Highly intelligent and heroic, he teams up with Jack and Gwen to solve the mystery behind "Miracle Day". He is joined by Esther Drummond (Alexa Havins), a CIA watch analyst with an optimistic faith in humanity. Arlene Tur was cast as surgeon Vera Juarez, while Bill Pullman played Oswald Danes, a dangerous convicted child sex offender and murderer who turns a prison release into celebrity status. Oswald faces lethal injection, but becomes swept up in the story's plot thread when he — like the rest of the world — simply does not die. Lauren Ambrose was cast as Jilly Kitzinger in seven of the ten episodes. Her character is described as "a sweet-talking PR genius with a heart of stone who's just cornered the most important client of her career ... and maybe of all time". Guest stars included Lena Kaur, Dichen Lachman, Wayne Knight, Ernie Hudson, C. Thomas Howell, John de Lancie, Nana Visitor and Dillon Casey.

Casting calls differed from the final press release. Pullman and Havins' characters' names were originally Oswald Jones and Esther Katusi, respectively. Additionally, calls originally specified that Rex was to be played by a white actor and Esther by a non-white actress. One Tree Hills Chad Michael Murray and Dollhouse Enver Gjokaj both auditioned for the part of Matheson. Greek star Amber Stevens also auditioned for the part of Katusi/Drummond. During the development phase, actor James Marsters expressed strong interest in returning as his Series 2 character Captain John Hart.

Main cast and guest stars

Locations

Locations used in Wales include Cardiff International Airport and the National Trust's Old Rectory cottage in Rhossili Bay On 1 February 2011 filming returned to the Coal Exchange in Cardiff Bay. The Coal Exchange was last used for John Frobisher's offices in Children of Earth. A pharmacy in Swansea was used for a scene which sees Gwen Cooper crash a car into the front of the shop.

Music
Torchwood and Doctor Who composer Murray Gold composed music for the fourth series with assistant composer Stu Kennedy.

Promotion
A teaser trailer was released on 1 April 2011, featuring the earth stylised as a giant bomb after a news reporter announces that "At 10:36pm, the last death on the planet Earth was recorded." The song Perfect Day by Lou Reed was used as a backing soundtrack to the trailer. A promotional poster had earlier been released, featuring the same bomb motif. Actors John Barrowman and Bill Pullman, alongside executive producer Julie Gardner, attended the 2011 MIPTV event in Cannes to promote the series. Speaking of the new series, Gardner commented that "[Torchwood is] taking the Welsh global — retaining the best of British drama while learning all about US production values". John Barrowman spoke of how the new series will be "bigger and better" because of the increased opportunities of the American co-production. Promotional pictures of the Torchwood: Miracle Day Cast, along with character biographies, were released in May 2011. Jack Harkness and Gwen Cooper feature on the front cover of Radio Times magazine for 9–15 July 2011. The pair were also on the front cover of TV & Satellite Week for the same week. Starz organised a 'March of The Soulless' on Thursday, 7 July 2011 to promote the new series.

Broadcast
Miracle Day was first shown on Starz on 8 July 2011 in the US. On 9 July 2011 it was shown on Space in Canada, and on UKTV Australia in Australia. It was first broadcast in the UK on 14 July 2011 on BBC One. On 19 July 2011 it was announced it had been bought by Eleven, a Network Ten Australia free-to-air digital-only channel, but  has not broadcast it. Different edits were produced for the US and UK broadcasts. According to writer Jane Espenson, the only differences are "a 10 second trim in the UK version of ep.3 and a three-second cut in the UK ep.6." The actual cut for episode 3 for UK airing was 30 seconds.

Critical reception
American reviews were mixed. The New York Times described the show as "a letdown" and the Los Angeles Times describing it as "repetitive".

Though Guardian reviewer Dan Martin had initially responded warmly to the series, his later overview of the series was more critical. Despite showing promise with its opener, Martin states that it is an "understatement" to say that Miracle Day has proved divisive with audiences. He recommends that the story would have worked better as a five-parter in the style of Children of Earth, as it seemed that the plot was stretched thin. Other criticisms focused on Jack's relatively minimal role, the unclear direction of the Oswald Danes storyline, the lack of an alien presence in the series, and the show's expectation that the audience care for Rex and Esther, whom they have not had a chance to get to know. Commenting that "the series seemed to spend weeks looking at the consequences of the Miracle, running away from unnamed baddies, extraditions, deportations, and dangling character arcs", he does however commend Davies for the innovative transatlantic production behind the series: "Perhaps the best way of looking at Miracle Day is as a first attempt. Taking a cultish British programme and giving it a cash injection and a platform for a global audience is a brave move."

After the series finale Martin further notes that "Children of Earth ended with a resolution that could have very easily wrapped the series up." Miracle Day, however, ended with several cliffhangers, which Martin found strange in view of its unfavourable reviews and the fact that Davies was not sure he would do any more Torchwood.

Charlie Jane Anders for io9 expressed some continuity concerns that are raised by relating Miracle Day to Doctor Who, the parent show of Torchwood. As  Miracle Day seemingly supposes a catastrophic worldwide phenomenon lasting at least from March to May 2011, it seems quite incompatible with the world of Doctor Who, where in Steven Moffat's 2011 series, companions Amy (Karen Gillan) and Rory (Arthur Darvill) are based in this exact time period without any mention of the problem, or evidence of global catastrophe elsewhere. Anders comments that in the past, the two shows had always "maintained a fairly tight continuity".

Notes

References

External links
 
 Official US website
Official UK website
 

2011 American television seasons
Television shows written by Russell T Davies
Miracle Day
British television miniseries
2010s American television miniseries
Starz original programming
Films set in Washington, D.C.
Films set in Los Angeles
Films set in Virginia
English-language television shows
2010s American LGBT-related television series
2011 British television seasons